Svoboda is a rural locality (a selo) and the administrative centre of Svobodinsky Selsoviet, Kuyurgazinsky District, Bashkortostan, Russia. The population was 629 as of 2010. There are 8 streets.

Geography 
Svoboda is located 30 km west of Yermolayevo (the district's administrative centre) by road. Novotaymasovo is the nearest rural locality.

References 

Rural localities in Kuyurgazinsky District